HD 114783 b is an exoplanet that has a minimum mass almost exactly that of Jupiter. However, since the true mass is not known, it may be more massive, but not likely much. It orbits the star 20% further than Earth orbits the Sun. The orbit is quite circular.

See also
 HD 114386 b

References

External links 
 

Exoplanets discovered in 2001
Giant planets
Virgo (constellation)
Exoplanets detected by radial velocity